The Foro Italico (Italian Forum) is a pedestrian path and park along the seafront of Palermo, Sicily, Italy.

In 1582, viceroy Marcantonio Colonna created a walking path in this part of the coast, that became a favorite destination for the leisure of the upper classes of the city in the 17th and 18th centuries. Until the integration of Sicily into the Kingdom of Italy, the park had been called Foro Borbonico or Siciliano, but by the 20th-century, it had been renamed Foro Italico. 

It is entirely pedestrian, is approximately 40,000 m2 in size, with large lawns, Mediterranean flora of various kinds, benches, trees, ceramic sculptures, a bike path, night lighting and a wide scenic walk along the coast. It was redeveloped in 2003, when the lawn, the pedestrian paths, the public lighting, and an irrigation system were improved. The project was carried out by the technicians of the municipality of Palermo.

Since April 2018 the Foro has hosted a weekly 5km Parkrun.

References

The athletic complex called the Foro Italico was built under Mussolini in Rome.

Bibliography
G. Venturini, Sicilia, Touring Club Italiano, Milano 2002, p. 59.

Gardens in Palermo
Parks in Palermo